The 1901–02 Minnesota Golden Gophers men's basketball team represented the University of Minnesota in intercollegiate basketball during the 1901–02 season. The team finished the season with a 15–0 record and were retroactively named national champions by the Helms Athletic Foundation and the Premo-Porretta Power Poll.

Starters
Source
 William Deering – Forward
 Henry Holden – Forward
 George Tuck – Center
 M. A. Kiefer – Guard
 Roy Ireland – Guard

Schedule

|-
! colspan="9" style="text-align: center; background:#800000"|Regular season

Source

References

Minnesota Golden Gophers men's basketball seasons
Minnesota
NCAA Division I men's basketball tournament championship seasons
Minnesota Golden Gophers Men's Basketball Team
Minnesota Golden Gophers Men's Basketball Team